Côte-de-Liesse is a planned Réseau express métropolitain station in the borough of Saint-Laurent in Montreal, Quebec, Canada. It is planned to be operated by CDPQ Infra and serves the Deux-Montagnes branch of the REM.

It will be the transfer station between the REM and the Mascouche line. The station was known as Correspondance A-40 during development, named after Quebec Autoroute 40.

References

Railway stations in Montreal
Saint-Laurent, Quebec
Réseau express métropolitain railway stations
Railway stations scheduled to open in 2024
Exo commuter rail stations